The Society of Red Tape Cutters was a series of small articles published by newspapers during World War II to give recognition to military and political figures for keeping bureaucracy from hindering the war effort. Each announcement included a boilerplate "certificate" illustrated by Dr. Seuss and a synopsis of the inductee's actions.

Recipients
President Franklin Delano Roosevelt
Vice President Harry S. Truman
Admiral Chester Nimitz
Russian Commissar Vyacheslav Molotov
Secretary of State Cordell Hull
Admiral Ernest King
Elmer Davis, director of the United States Office of War Information
Fiorello H. LaGuardia, mayor of New York City
Claire Lee Chennault, commander of the Flying Tigers

References

Works by Dr. Seuss
United States home front during World War II